Crystal River Airport – Captain Tom Davis Field  is a public airport located three miles (5 km) southeast of the central business district of Crystal River, in Citrus County, Florida, United States. It is owned by Citrus County.

This airport is assigned a three-letter location identifier of CGC by the Federal Aviation Administration, but it does not have an International Air Transport Association (IATA) airport code (the IATA assigned CGC to Cape Gloucester Airport in Papua New Guinea).

Facilities and aircraft 

For the 12-month period ending May 9, 2002, the airport had 36,600 aircraft operations, an average of 100 per day: 98% general aviation, 1% air taxi and  1% military. There are 50 aircraft based at this airport: 86% single engine, 10% multi-engine, 2% helicopter and 2% glider.

A non-aviation Florida Army National Guard facility is located at the airport which periodically hosts visiting Florida Army National Guard aircraft from other FLARNG installations.

In December 2013, the Citrus County Board of County Commissioners passed a resolution modifying the airport's name to Crystal River Airport – Captain Tom Davis Field.  CAPT Tom Davis, USN (Ret), is an accomplished Naval Aviator out of the Navy's jet fighter community and a recipient of the Legion of Merit and the Distinguished Flying Cross.  Retiring from the Navy in 1978 following 33 years of service, CAPT Davis settled in Crystal River, starting a flight school at the airport that eventually became the facility's fixed-base operator (FBO).  CAPT Davis also volunteered to become the airport manager and oversaw numerous capital improvements, including the addition of the airport's 4,555 foot paved runway.  As of 2014, CAPT Davis had logged in excess of 24,000 military and civilian flight hours, is an FAA Designated Pilot Examiner and has received the FAA Master Pilot Award.

References

External links 

Airports in Florida
Transportation buildings and structures in Citrus County, Florida
Crystal River, Florida